Opao can refer to the following places in the Philippines:

 Opao Island, in the municipality of Bulalacao, Oriental Mindoro
 Opao, a barangay in the city of Mandaue
 Opao, a barangay in the municipality of Pinamungajan, Cebu
 Opao, a barangay in the city of Dapitan, Zamboanga del Norte

References